Russefjella is a mountain ridge in Sørkapp Land at Spitsbergen, Svalbard. It has a length of about five kilometers, and is located east of Skilfonna. The highest peak on the ridge is 580 m.a.s.l.

References

Mountains of Spitsbergen